The Christian Social Party (or PSC; , CVP) was a major centre-right political party in Belgium which existed from 1945 until 1968. Established as the successor to the pre-war Catholic Block, the new party was established with a "deconfessionalised" Christian Democrat orientation but split along linguistic lines in 1968 into the Christian Social Party (Parti Social Chrétien) and  Christian People's Party (Christelijke Volkspartij). As the largest party throughout much of the period of its existence, it participated in most of the country's coalition governments during its existence alongside the Belgian Socialist Party and Liberal Party and provided a number of influential prime ministers.

History
At the end of World War II, on 18–19 August 1945 the Parti Social Chrétien-Christelijke Volkspartij (CVP-PSC) was founded under the presidency of August de Schryver as the successor to the Catholic Party.

In 1968, the party divided along linguistic lines, forming the Francophone Christian Social Party (Parti Social Chrétien) in Wallonia and the Flemish Christian People's Party (Christelijke Volkspartij) in Flanders.

Election results

Chamber of Representatives

Notable members
 Jean Duvieusart
 Gaston Eyskens
 Pierre Harmel
 Théo Lefèvre
 Joseph Pholien
 Paul Vanden Boeynants
 Jean Van Houtte
 Count Jean Charles Snoy et d'Oppuers

See also
 Politics of Belgium
 Christene Volkspartij
 Graves de communi re
 Rerum novarum

Further reading

Sources

 Th. Luykx and M. Platel, Politieke geschiedenis van België, 2 vol., Kluwer, 1985
 E. Witte, J. Craeybeckx en A. Meynen, Politieke geschiedenis van België, Standaard, 1997

References

External links 
 Archives of Christian Social Party in ODIS - Online Database for Intermediary Structures

Defunct political parties in Belgium
Christian democratic parties in Belgium
Defunct Christian political parties
1945 establishments in Belgium
1968 disestablishments in Belgium
Political parties established in 1945
Political parties disestablished in 1968